Maria George (born 3 March 1965) is a former New Zealand association football player who represented her country.

George made her Football Ferns debut in a 0–2 loss to Taiwan on 3 October 1982 and ended her international career with 6 caps to her credit.

George was in the New Zealand at the Women's World Cup finals in China in 1991 but did not take the field at the tournament.

References

External links

1965 births
Living people
New Zealand women's international footballers
New Zealand women's association footballers
1991 FIFA Women's World Cup players
Women's association football defenders